James Joseph McCarthy was an Irish architect famous for his design of ecclesiastical buildings. McCarthy was born in Dublin, Ireland on 6 January 1817. His parents were from County Kerry. He was educated by the Christian Brothers in Richmond St., and went on to study architecture at the Royal Dublin Society School.
He was a follower of the style of the architect Pugin and Gothic Revival.

McCarthy served as Professor of Ecclesiastical Architecture at All Hallows College, Dublin. He was also appointed Professor of Architecture at the Catholic University of Ireland and at the Royal Hibernian Academy. McCarthy was a friend of Dr. Bartholomew Woodlock, who had been rector of both All Hallows' and the Catholic University, and he helped Woodlock to found the Irish Ecclesiological Society in 1849.
He was also a close friend of Charles Gavan Duffy and was a member of the Young Irelanders.

He died in 1882 and is interred in Glasnevin Cemetery.

Buildings
J.J McCarthy completed over fifty commissions for Churches, Monasteries, Convents and Cathedrals.
Cathedral of the Assumption, Thurles,    Co. Tipperary
St. Brendan's, Ardfert, Co. Kerry
 Our Lady of the Immaculate Conception, Ballingarry, County Limerick
 St. Kevins, Glendalough
 St. James's Church, Killorglin, Co. Kerry
 St. Joseph's, Carrickmacross, Monaghan
 St Macartan's Cathedral, Monaghan 
 St. Mary's Church, Dingle, Co. Kerry
 St. Mary's Parish Church, Maynooth, Co. Kildare
 St. Mary's Church, Rathkeale, Co. Limerick.
 St. Patrick's Cathedral, Armagh
 St. Peter and Paul Church, Kilmallock, Co. Limerick,
 Mortuary Chapel, Glasnevin Cemetery, Dublin
 Capuchian Franciscan Church, Church Street, Dublin
 Holy Trinity Church, Cookstown 
 College Chapel, St. Patrick's College, Maynooth, Co. Kildare
 College Chapel, Clonliffe College, Dublin
 Ladychapel Church, Maynooth, Co. Kildare
 St. Michael's Church, Ballinasloe, Co. Galway
 St Patrick's church , Mayobridge
 St Patricks church Dungannon, Tyrone
 St. Saviour’s Dominican Church, Dublin (1861)
 St. Saviour's Dominican Church, Limerick (1870)

External links 

 Entry at the Irish Architectural Archive

References

1817 births
1882 deaths
Irish ecclesiastical architects
19th-century Irish architects
Architects from Dublin (city)